Šarbanovac may refer to:

 Šarbanovac (Bor), a village in Serbia
 Šarbanovac (Knjaževac), a village in Serbia
 Šarbanovac (Sokobanja), a village in Serbia